Qorghan (also Romanized as Qarghan; also known as Gharghan, Qūrghan, and Qūrqan) is a village in Kenarrudkhaneh Rural District, in the Central District of Golpayegan County, Isfahan Province, Iran. At the 2006 census, its population was 228, in 73 families.

References 

Populated places in Golpayegan County